The Cleveland Red Sox was a Negro league baseball team in the Negro National League, based in Cleveland, Ohio, in 1934. In their only season, they finished with a 4-25 record.

References

African-American history in Cleveland
Negro league baseball teams
Red Sox
Defunct baseball teams in Ohio
Baseball teams disestablished in 1934
Baseball teams established in 1934